List of Tokyo Metro stations lists stations on the Tokyo Metro, including lines serving the station, station location (ward or city), opening date, design (underground, at-grade, or elevated), and daily ridership.

Summary
There are a total of 142 unique stations (i.e., counting stations served by multiple lines only once) on the Tokyo Metro network, or 179 total stations if each station on each line counts as one station. Tokyo Metro considers Kokkai-gijidō-mae and Tameike-Sannō as a single interchange station, despite the two stations having different names. If these are treated as separate stations, there are a total of 143 unique stations and 180 total stations, respectively. Most stations are located within the 23 special wards and fall inside the Yamanote Line loop—some wards such as Setagaya and Ōta have no stations (or only a limited number of stations), as rail service in these areas has historically been provided by the Toei Subway or any of the various .

In general, the reported daily ridership is the total of faregate entries and exits at each station, and excludes in-system transfers. However, Tokyo Metro reports ridership separately for stations directly shared with other railways—e.g., Shirokanedai and other Namboku Line stations shared with the Toei Mita Line—or “interface” stations that allow for through-servicing and transfers with other railways without exiting the station's paid area—e.g., Ayase on the Chiyoda Line. For stations directly shared with other railways, the daily ridership only considers people using Tokyo Metro trains (or through-servicing trains owned by other railways operating as Tokyo Metro trains). For interface stations, the daily ridership also includes cross-company passengers on through-servicing trains (as part of trackage rights agreements) or transferring from other railways' trains without passing through faregates.

Because of Tokyo Metro's reporting method, stations served by multiple lines that qualify both as shared or interface stations and as “regular” (i.e., not shared and non-interface) stations generally have their ridership separated out by station type. Examples include Shibuya, where ridership for the interconnected Hanzōmon Line and Fukutoshin Line stations (which are interface stations for the Tōkyū Den-en-toshi Line and Tōkyū Tōyoko Line, respectively) is separated out from ridership at the Shibuya terminal station of the Ginza Line, which does not have through-service arrangements with any other railways.

Opening dates are given in standard Japanese date format (YYYY.MM.DD), and arranged from oldest to newest for stations served by multiple lines.

Stations

Stations with Metro and commuter rail connections

Subway stations only

References

Tokyo Metro stations
Tokyo
 
Metro stations